FC Alle is a football team from Kanton JURA Switzerland which plays in the 2. Liga in Switzerland.

Current squad

External links 
 

Alle
1931 establishments in Switzerland
Association football clubs established in 1931